Cam is both a given name and a surname, often a shorthand for Cameron or Camilla. Notable people with the name include:

Given name
Cam (singer), born Camaron Ochs, American singer
Cam Akers (born 1999), American football player
Cam Anthony (born 2001), American singer
Cam Archer (born 1981), American filmmaker, writer, and photographer
Cam Cairncross (born 1972), former Australian Major League Baseball pitcher
Cam Cameron (born 1961), former NFL head coach
Cam Gigandet (born 1982), American actor
Cam Gill (born 1997), American football player
Cam Glenn (born 1996), American football player
Cam Lyman, American multimillionaire who died mysteriously
Cam Janssen (born 1984), American-born professional ice hockey player
Cam Jurgens (born 1999), American football player
Cam Lewis (born 1997), American football player
Cam Neely (born 1965), former Canadian-born professional ice hockey player
Cam Newton (born 1989), American football player
Cam Polson (born 1989), Canadian rugby union player
Cam Reddish (born 1999), American basketball player
Cam Robinson (born 1995), American football player
Cam Sims (born 1996), American football player
Cam Taylor-Britt (born 1999), American football player
Cam Ward (born 1984), Canadian professional ice hockey goaltender
Cam Woolley (born 1957), Canadian television journalist and former police officer

Surname
 Helen Cam (1885-1968), English historian
 Sandra Cam (born 1972), Belgian freestyle swimmer